Roberto Soares Barbosa (born ), better known as Barbosinha, is a Brazilian futsal player who plays as a pivot for Atlântico and the Brazil national futsal team.

Moves to the Belarusian club "Stalitsa"

References

External links
 Liga Nacional de Futsal profile
 The Final Ball profile

1988 births
Living people
Brazilian men's futsal players